Robert Arthur Jr. (November 10, 1909 – May 2, 1969) was a writer and editor of crime fiction and speculative fiction known for his work with The Mysterious Traveler radio series and for writing The Three Investigators, a series of young adult novels.

Arthur was honoured twice by the Mystery Writers of America with an Edgar Award for Best Radio Drama. He also wrote scripts Alfred Hitchcock's TV show, Alfred Hitchcock Presents.

Biography

Personal life 
Arthur was born on November 10, 1909, in Fort Mills, Corregidor Island in the Philippines while his father, Robert Arthur Sr., was stationed there as a lieutenant in the United States Army. Arthur spent his childhood moving from place to place, wherever his father was stationed.

Although he was accepted to West Point Arthur decided not to pursue a military career like his father and instead in 1926 enrolled at William and Mary College in Williamsburg, Virginia. After two years, he transferred to the University of Michigan, where he graduated from with a B.A. in English in 1930.

Arthur died at the age of fifty-nine in Philadelphia, on May 2, 1969.

Professional career 
After graduating, he worked as an editor and later returned to the University of Michigan where he completed his M.A. in Journalism in 1932.

Writing for fiction magazines and TV 

His stories were published in, among other magazines, The Magazine of Fantasy and Science Fiction, Ellery Queen's Mystery Magazine, Mercury Mystery , Amazing Stories, Argosy All-Story Weekly, Black Mask, Collier's, Detective Fiction Weekly, Detective Tales, Double Detective, The Illustrated Detective Magazine, The Phantom Detective, The Shadow, Startling Stories, Street & Smith'''s Detective Story Magazine, Thrilling Detective, Unknown Worlds and Wonder Stories.

Additionally, Arthur wrote a number of mystery novels for children and young adults. His most successful stories were a series of mystery books called The Three Investigators.

In 1959, he moved to Hollywood and began writing and editing screenplays and scripts for television shows.

Radio
Arthur, along with his writing partner David Kogan, was honoured twice by the Mystery Writers of America with an Edgar Award for Best Radio Drama. First in 1950 for Murder by Experts, and then in 1953 for The Mysterious Traveler.

Other radio credits include: Dark Destiny (1942), Adventure Into Fear (1945), The Sealed Book (1945), The Teller of Tales (1950) and Mystery Time (1952).

Bibliography

 "Alfred Hitchcock and the Three Investigators" novels 
 1: The Secret of Terror Castle (1965)
 2: The Mystery of the Stuttering Parrot (1965)
 3: The Mystery of the Whispering Mummy (1965)
 4: The Mystery of the Green Ghost (1965)
 5: The Mystery of the Vanishing Treasure (1966)
 6: The Secret of Skeleton Island (1966)
 7: The Mystery of the Fiery Eye (1967)
 8: The Mystery of the Silver Spider (1967)
 9: The Mystery of the Screaming Clock (1968)
 11: The Mystery of the Talking Skull (1969)
Three Investigator novels numbered 10 and 12 to 43 were written by other authors.

Short story collections by Robert Arthur Jr.
 Ghosts and More Ghosts (1963)
 Mystery and More Mystery (1966)
 The Midnight VisitorShort story collections edited by Robert Arthur Jr.
  Alfred Hitchcock Presents Stories for Late at Night (1961)
  Alfred Hitchcock's Haunted Houseful (1961)
  Alfred Hitchcock's Ghostly Gallery (1962)
  Alfred Hitchcock's Solve-Them-Yourself-Mysteries (1963) (All stories written by Robert Arthur with the exception of "The Mystery of the Sinister Theft")
  Alfred Hitchcock Presents Stories That My Mother Never Told Me (1963)
  Alfred Hitchcock's Monster Museum (1965)
  Alfred Hitchcock Presents Stories Not for the Nervous (1965)
  Alfred Hitchcock's Sinister Spies (1966)
  Alfred Hitchcock Presents Stories That Scared Even Me (1967)
  Alfred Hitchcock's Spellbinders in Suspense (1967)
  Alfred Hitchcock Presents Stories They Wouldn't Let Me Do On TV (1968)
  Davy Jones Haunted Locker (1965)
  Spies and More Spies (1967)
  Thrillers and More Thrillers (1968)
  Monster Mix (1968)
  Alfred Hitchcock's Daring Detectives (1969)

Television writing credits
 The Unforeseen (1960)
 Matinee Theatre (1955) (episode: "The Babylonian Heart")
 Alfred Hitchcock Presents (episode: "The Jokester")
 Thriller'' (1961–1962) (episodes: "An Attractive Family", "Dialogues with Death", "The Prisoner in the Mirror")

References

External links
Biography by daughter Elizabeth Arthur 
Robert Arthur, Jr. at The Three Investigators series fansite 

 

1909 births
1969 deaths

20th-century American novelists
20th-century American male writers
American fantasy writers
American horror writers
American male novelists
American mystery writers
American male screenwriters
Burials at West Laurel Hill Cemetery
Edgar Award winners
American male short story writers
Hampton High School (Virginia) alumni
Three Investigators
University of Michigan College of Literature, Science, and the Arts alumni
20th-century American short story writers
20th-century American screenwriters